3,3′-Diaminobenzidine (DAB) is an organic compound with the formula (C6H3(NH2)2)2.  This derivative of benzidine is a precursor to polybenzimidazole, which forms fibers that are renowned for their chemical and thermal stability.  As its water-soluble tetrahydrochloride, DAB has been used in immunohistochemical staining of nucleic acids and proteins.

Structure
DAB is symmetric about the central carbon bond between both ring structures. In the crystal, the rings of each molecule are co-planar and the amine units connect molecules to form an intermolecular 3-dimensional hydrogen bond network.

Preparation
Diaminobenzidine, which is commercially available, is prepared by treating 3,3′-dichlorobenzidine with ammonia with a copper catalyst at high temperature and pressure, followed by acidic workup.

An alternate synthesis route involves the diacylation of benzidine with acetic anhydride under basic conditions:
(NH2)C6H4C6H4(NH2) + 2 (CH3CO)2O ⟶ (NHCOCH3)C6H4C6H4(NHCOCH3) + 2 CH3CO2H

The diacetylated compound then undergoes nitration with nitric acid to produce an ortho-dinitro compound due to the ortho-directing acetyl substituents:
(NHCOCH3)C6H4C6H4(NHCOCH3) + 2HNO3 ⟶ (O2N)(NHCOCH3)C6H3C6H3(NHCOCH3)(NO2) + 2H2O

The acetyl groups are then removed through saponification:
(O2N)(NHCOCH3)C6H3C6H3(NHCOCH3)(NO2) + 2NaOH ⟶ (O2N)(NH2)C6H3C6H3(NH2)(NO2) + 2(NaOCOCH3)

The dinitrobenzidine compound is then reduced with hydrochloric acid and iron to produce 3,3′-diaminobenzidine:
3(O2N)(NH2)C6H3C6H3(NH2)(NO2) + 12HCl + 10Fe0 ⟶ 3(NH2)2C6H3C6H3(NH2)2 + 4Fe2O3 + 6FeCl2

The reduction of the dinitrobenzidine compound can also proceed with tin(II) chloride instead of iron powder or with sodium dithionite in methanol.

Applications
In its main application, DAB is the precursor to polybenzimidazole.

Diaminobenzidine is oxidized by hydrogen peroxide in the presence of hemoglobin to give a dark-brown color. This color change is used to detect fingerprints in blood. The solubility of DAB in water allows for adaptability compared to other detection solutions which use toxic solvents. Improperly prepared tissue samples may give false positives.
In research, this reaction is used to stain cells that were prepared with hydrogen peroxidase enzyme, following common immunocytochemistry protocols. Relevant to Alzheimer's disease, Aβ protein amyloid plaques are targeted by a primary antibody, and subsequently by a secondary antibody, which is conjugated with a peroxidase enzyme.  This will bind DAB as a substrate and oxidize it, producing an easily observable brown color. Plaques can then be quantified for further evaluation. One other method uses complexes of injected biocytin with avidin or streptavidin, biotin, and then peroxidase.

References

External links
 Fishersci.com
 Polysciences.com

Anilines
Biphenyls